Serena Meredith Berman is an American actress, singer, and writer. She has done voice-over work for animated series and films. She played Elyon Brown on the T.V. Series W.I.T.C.H. as a teenager, and she has guest starred in shows such as Ned's Declassified School Survival Guide and Justice League (TV series). She appeared in the romantic comedy film Set It Up which stars Zoey Deutch and Glen Powell.

Biography
Serena began working as an actress from a young age. She grew up in Santa Monica, California. In her later teen years, Serena focused more closely on her studies at Harvard-Westlake School in Los Angeles, California, but did have a role in Just Peck. She studied acting at New York University, at the Tisch School of the Arts and has a B.F.A. in Drama.

Career
Serena appeared in 44 episodes of the Disney animated television series W.I.T.C.H. and created a small following for her character of Elyon Brown. As the voice of Elyon Brown, she was often a guest at various fan conventions.

Berman also made appearances in Ned's Declassified School Survival Guide as Marty's sister Marva, and as Lucy van Pelt in both Lucy Must Be Traded, Charlie Brown and Charlie Brown's Christmas Tales.

 Set It Up (2018) 
 Just Peck (2009) (TV movie)
 W.I.T.C.H. (2004–2006) (TV series, voice)
 Ned's Declassified School Survival Guide (2006) (TV series)
 Lucy Must Be Traded, Charlie Brown (2003) (TV movie, voice) (as Lucy van Pelt)
 Charlie Brown's Christmas Tales (2002) (TV movie, voice) (as Lucy van Pelt)
 Justice League (2002) (TV series, voice)
 The Others (2000) (TV series)
 Seven Girlfriends (1999)

Filmography

Film

Television

References

External links
 
 Witch Fans Unite, August 10, 2008, "Elyon Brown, Queen of Meridian Gallery!"
 x-witch-fan-syt-11-x.piczo.com, w.i.t.c.h. characters

20th-century births
Living people
American voice actresses
American television actresses
American child actresses
Actresses from Los Angeles
Actresses from New York City
Writers from New York City
Harvard-Westlake School alumni
Tisch School of the Arts alumni
Year of birth missing (living people)